The College Admissions Scandal is a 2019 TV film that aired on Lifetime as part of its "Ripped from the Headlines" feature film. The film is based on the 2019 college admissions bribery scandal and stars Penelope Ann Miller, Mia Kirshner, and Michael Shanks. It tells a fictional account of the event that involves two fictional characters.

Premise
Caroline DeVere (Penelope Ann Miller) and Bethany Slade (Mia Kirshner) are two wealthy mothers. Caroline is an interior designer and Bethany owns a financial services firm. When they want their teenagers to get into a college, they resort to paying Rick Singer (Michael Shanks) to get them in.

Cast
 Penelope Ann Miller as Caroline DeVere
 Mia Kirshner as Bethany Slade
 Michael Shanks as Rick Singer
 Sarah Dugdale as Emma Slade
 Sam Duke as Danny DeVere
 Robert Moloney as Jackson DeVere
 Kendra Westwood as Carla Pontrell

Production
On September 5, 2019, ET Online reported that characters in the film would be depicted by actresses Mia Kirshner and Penelope Ann Miller in roles inspired by Lori Loughlin's and Felicity Huffman's involvement in the college admissions matter. Describing her role, Kirshner was quoted saying, "This story is about privilege and corruption and it's about people who don't follow the rules because they think they're above rules... My character (based on Loughlin but named "Bethany" in the film) is so corrupt, greedy, narcissistic, self-centered, and the dialogue is hilarious, so I'm glad that they're able to capture humor about this as well."

Reception

The film premiered with a 719,000 viewers. On Rotten Tomatoes, the film scored  based on  reviews. On Metacritic, the film scored a 57.

References

External links
 

2019 television films
2019 films
Lifetime (TV network) films
Films set in universities and colleges
Films with screenplays by Stephen Tolkin
Films about academic scandals
Films directed by Adam Salky